Gábor Lisznyai-Szabó (Budapest, 8 December 1913 – 22 May 1981) was a Hungarian composer and - although a Catholic - a regular organist at the Dohány Street Synagogue.

Works, editions and recordings
 Missa "Szentkereszt" (Holy Cross mass) 1938
 Missa Et unam sanctam 1942
 Missa simplex 1945
 Requiem 1945
 Oratorio: István királyhoz, King Stephen
 Oratorio: Karácsonyi, Christmas oratorio
 Kantáta Bethlen - Bethlehem cantata
 Magyar istenes énekek - 5 Hungarian religious songs 1975
 organ works
 Ösz for cello and piano

Recording
 Puer natus in Bethlehem

References

Hungarian organists
Male classical organists
Hungarian composers
Hungarian male composers
1913 births
1981 deaths
Musicians from Budapest
20th-century composers
Synagogue organists
20th-century organists
20th-century Hungarian male musicians